The  is a two-line suspended monorail system located in Chiba, Chiba Prefecture, Japan. Investors include the city of Chiba.

The first segment (Line 2 from Sports Center Station to Chishirodai Station) opened on March 28, 1988, also the rest by March 24, 1999. The PASMO contactless smart card can be used to purchase fares.

Routes

Line 1
Line 1 connects Chibaminato Station and Kenchōmae Station by a  multiple-track route. Operating at 1,500 V DC, trains make four intermediate stops.

Station list

Line 2
Line 2 connects Chiba Station and Chishiro-dai Station. Operating at 1,500 V DC, trains make 11 intermediate stops on the  multiple-track route. Nearly all trains continue on Line 1 to Chiba-Minato Station.

Station list

Extension plans
Extensions of Line 1 had been proposed, notably a five-station,  extension from Kenchō-mae Station to Chiba Municipal Aoba Hospital. However, in 2004 an evaluation committee found that there was no need for the extension, and proposed closing the underused segment from Chiba Station to Kencho-mae Station.  There was also a plan to extend the line from Anagawa Station to Inage and Inage-kaigan Station.

On 4 September 2019, Chiba City announced that it had decided to discontinue plans to extend the monorail hospital route, and not to introduce a monorail on the Inage route.

History

 1979/03/20 – The company was established.
 1988/03/28 – Line 2 between Sports Center Station and Chishirodai Station opened.
 1990/09/18 – The total number of passengers reached 10 million.
 1991/06/12 – Line 2 opened between Chiba Station and Sports Center Station.
 1994/03/07 – The total number of passengers reached 50 million.
 1995/08/01 – Line 1 between Chiba Minato Station and Chiba Station opened.
 1997/06/17 – The total number of passengers reached 100 million.
 1999/03/24 – Line 1 between Chiba Station and Kencho-mae Station opened. At the same time, the running time for Line 2 was shortened by about 10%, and automatic ticket machines were installed at all stations.
2006 – Chiba Prefecture pulls out from funding the monorail due to unsatisfactory ridership numbers.
 2006/06/21 – A train collided with the arm of a crane truck working on a sewer line between Sakusabe Station and Chiba-Koen Station on Line 2.
 2007/03/19 – The four-car trains that had been in service were discontinued.
 2009/03/14 – PASMO introduced.
 2012/07/08 – The new trains "Urban Flyer 0-type" began operating.
 2019/02/20 – Announced the introduction of station numbering at all stations in anticipation of the 2020 Tokyo Olympics and Paralympics.
 2020/09/09 – A fire broke out when a contractor accidentally cut a cable during substation renewal work, causing all lines to be suspended.
 2021/05/31 – The total number of passengers reached 500 million.

Special tickets
Holiday Free Pass (ホリデーフリーきっぷ)
Available: Saturdays, Sundays, and holidays.
Cost: Adults 630 yen, children 320 yen
Valid: All day on the day of purchase.
2-Day Free Pass (2-DAYフリーきっぷ)
Available: Two consecutive days. Saturdays, Sundays and holidays.
Cost: Adults 1050 yen, children 530 yen
Valid: All day on the day of purchase.
Lunchtime Free Pass (お昼のお出かけフリーきっぷ)
Available: From 10AM to 6PM on weekdays.
Cost: Adults 620 yen, children 310 yen
Valid: From 10AM to 6PM on day purchased.

See also
 Monorails in Japan
 List of rapid transit systems
 Skybus Metro

References

External links

 Company website in English
 Company website in Japanese

Monorails
Suspended monorails
SAFEGE people movers
Railway lines opened in 1988
 
Monorails in Japan
Transport in Chiba (city)
Companies based in Chiba Prefecture
Japanese third-sector railway lines
1988 establishments in Japan